Serbia competed at the 2006 European Athletics Championships held in Gothenburg, Sweden, between 7 August and 13 August 2006. 9 athletes represented Serbia, 5 men and 4 women.

Medals

Participants

References
 Serbia at the 2006 European Athletics Championship - Dnevnik newspapers (Serbian language)

Serbia at the European Athletics Championships
Nations at the 2006 European Athletics Championships
2006 in Serbian sport